A constitutional referendum was held in Bolivia on Sunday, 21 February 2016. The proposed constitutional amendments would have allowed the president and vice president to run for a third consecutive term under the 2009 Constitution (which would be a fourth consecutive term, including their pre-2009 term). The proposal was voted down by a 51.3% majority.

Background

Article 168 of the 2009 constitution allows the President and Vice-President to put themselves forward for re-election only once, limiting the number of terms to two. The governing party, the Movement for Socialism (MAS) sponsored an effort to amend this article. The referendum was authorized by a combined session of the Plurinational Legislative Assembly on 26 September 2015, by a vote of 112 to 41. Law 757, which convenes the February referendum, was passed 113 to 43, and was promulgated on 5 November 2015.

Bolivian elections are conducted under an "act of good governance," which prohibits electoral propaganda in the days before an election, and tightly regulates motorized transport. It was illegal to buy or consume alcohol for 48 hours prior to the referendum to ensure voters took note of their decision.

A successful 'yes' vote would have allowed President Evo Morales and Vice President Álvaro García Linera to run for a fourth term in office in 2019. Morales had already been elected three times. The first time, in 2006, is not counted as it was before the two term limit was introduced by the 2009 constitution.

Disinformation campaigns 
In the run-up to the referendum, opponents claimed that Morales had fathered an out-of-wedlock child named "Ernesto Fidel Morales" after Ernesto "Che" Guevera and Fidel Castro. The story was "mostly fake news." There had been a relationship, but never a child, and the woman had borrowed a child from her aunt to present to the press in support of the false allegations. Referendum supporters claim that the allegations hurt Morales in the polls.

Opinion polls

Results

Aftermath
In September 2017 the Movement for Socialism applied to the Plurinational Constitutional Court to abolish term limits. In November the court ruled in favour of their abolition, citing the American Convention on Human Rights. The ruling allowed Morales to run for re-election in the 2019 elections.

References

Bolivia
Constitutional
Referendums in Bolivia
Reelection